The YMCA Queensland Youth Parliament (QYP) is a nonpartisan YMCA run model parliament program and youth organisation, based in Queensland, Australia.

It is one of a number of Australian YMCA Youth Parliaments. Its purpose is to facilitate and encourage political and civic engagement in young Queenslanders as well as promote leadership skills.

Overview 
QYP aims to provide a platform for young people to have their say on local, state and federal issues, build skills and parliamentary understanding, while simulating the Queensland Legislative Assembly in Queensland Parliament. The program selects one individual, aged 15 to 25 years old, to represent each electorate in the state, for a total of 93 participants (known as Youth Members).

The main component of the program is Youth Members developing Youth Bills (referred to as Youth Acts once passed) on their portfolio areas. These bills are debated at the Youth Parliament's Sitting week in Queensland Parliament House. Youth Bills that have been passed are signed by the Youth Governor for assent and then referred to the relevant Ministers within the Queensland Government for consideration.

Executive 
Queensland Youth Parliament is run by a YMCA-employed Program Coordinator and a team of volunteers called the Executive. The Executive includes portfolio mentors, media officers, a Parliamentary team, a Recreations, Community Engagement and Sponsorship team, and the Youth Governor. The current Youth Governor is His Excellency, the Honourable Jamie Robbins and the current Program Coordinator is Martin Boga.

Other programs 
Queensland Youth Parliament's Executive runs other programs alongside the Youth Parliament to promote political and civic engagement in young Queenslanders. This includes the "Your Voice Heard Blog" featuring blog posts and opinion pieces from Youth Members and other young Queenslanders, and various summits and forums.

In 2021, the program ran its first ever Regional Tour, aimed at promoting youth engagement with politics in rural areas.

History 
The first Australian Youth Parliament was held in Brisbane in 1963 as a one time event, based on the American "YMCA Youth and Government" concept, however Queensland's program didn't begin until much later.

The first session of the YMCA Queensland Youth Parliament was held in 1996 and has been run annually since. Currently the program is in its 28th year, and thousands of young people have been involved in the program.

Former Youth Governors

Notable alumni 
Alumni of the program include Kate Jones, former Queensland MP and Minister who was Youth Premier when she completed the program.

Format 

The program consist of three main phases; Launch Weekend, an interim research and drafting period, and Residential Sitting Week.

In early April, Youth Members attend a 3-day Launch Weekend where they meet other Youth Members, discuss ideas and are educated on the legislative processes of the Legislative Assembly. Parliamentary Portfolios are formed and begin to plan for Youth Bills.

In between Launch Weekend and Residential Sitting Week, the research and drafting phase occurs. Youth Members consult with community, stakeholders and Members of Parliament on their Youth Bills. They then draft the Bill and amendments to the Bill, as well as policy proposals on various topics. Drafting is facilitated by Portfolio Mentors, and assisted by the Queensland Office of Parliamentary Counsel.

Youth Members are encouraged to engage with their community, which may include volunteering or other advocacy work.

The program culminates in a seven-day Residential Sitting Week in September where Youth Members debate their Youth Bills and Matters of Public Importance in Queensland Parliament House. Youth Bills that have been passed are referred to Government and Opposition, with a view to providing politicians and their advisors with practical solutions to the concerns of young Queenslanders.

Portfolios 
Youth Members are organised into portfolios based on their areas of interest. In 2023, the portfolios are:
 Portfolio for Aboriginal and Torres Strait Islander Partnerships (ATSIP);
 Portfolio for Rural Communities, Transport and Main Roads, Communities and Housing (TORCH);
 Portfolio for Justice, Prevention of Family and Domestic Violence, Police and Corrective Services (JPACS);
 Portfolio for Science, Tourism, Innovation, Sport and Digital Economy (STDE);
 Portfolio for Education, Employment and Small Business, Training and Skills Development, & the Arts (EETA);
 Portfolio for the Environment and the Great Barrier Reef, Renewables and Hydrogen, & Energy (ERE);
 Portfolio for Health Services, Emergency and Ambulance Services, & Seniors and Disability Services (HEADS); and
 Portfolio for Regional Development and Manufacturing, Resources, Agriculture, & Trade and Investment (RARE).

See also 

 Junior State of America, a similar organisation
 YMCA Youth Parliament
YMCA NSW Youth Parliament 
Commonwealth Youth Parliament

References

External links 
YMCA Queensland Youth Parliament
YMCA Australia Youth Parliament Programs

Australian youth parliaments
YMCA
Youth councils